Godbold is a surname. Notable people with the surname include:

Cathy Godbold (1974–2018), Australian actress
Daryl Godbold (born 1964), former professional footballer
Edgar Godbold (1879–1952), 4th president of Southern Baptist-affiliated Louisiana College in Pineville
Harry Godbold (born 1939), former professional footballer
Jake Godbold (1933–2020), American politician
John Cooper Godbold (1920–2009), United States Circuit Judge for the United States Court of Appeals
John Godbolt or Godbold (1582–1648), English judge and politician who sat in the House of Commons in 1640
Lucile Godbold (1900–1981), distinguished American athlete
Mary Lou Godbold (1912–2008), American politician and educator